The 1939 Dartmouth Indians football team represented Dartmouth College in the 1939 college football season. The Indians were led by sixth-year head coach Earl Blaik and played their home games at Memorial Field in Hanover, New Hampshire. They finished with a record of 5–3–1 and outscored opponents by a total of 154 to 73. After amassing a 5–0–1 record to start the season and shutting out four of those opponents, Dartmouth ascended to 14th in the AP Poll, but lost their last three contests against, No. 4 Cornell, Princeton, and a Stanford team that finished 1–7–1—their only win coming against Dartmouth. Indians finish the year unranked.

Schedule

References

Dartmouth
Dartmouth Big Green football seasons
Dartmouth Indians football